USS Maple may refer to the following ships of the United States Navy:

 , was a tender with the US Navy and the Lighthouse Service during World War I
 , was renamed Hackberry shortly before launching in October 1940

See also
 , US Coast Guard cutter

United States Navy ship names